The 2011 Bauer Watertechnology Cup was a professional tennis tournament played on carpet courts. It was the 15th edition of the tournament and was part of the 2011 ATP Challenger Tour. It took place in Eckental, Germany between 31 October 2011 and 6 November 2011.

ATP entrants

Seeds

 1 Rankings are as of October 24, 2011.

Other entrants
The following players received wildcards into the singles main draw:
  Robin Kern
  Kevin Krawietz
  Philipp Petzschner
  Marcel Zimmermann

The following players received entry from the qualifying draw:
  Andre Begemann
  Jan Mertl
  Jan-Lennard Struff
  Mischa Zverev

The following players received entry as a "lucky loser" into the singles main draw:
  Philipp Oswald

Champions

Singles

 Rajeev Ram def.  Karol Beck, 6–4, 6–2

Doubles

 Andre Begemann /  Alexander Kudryavtsev def.  James Cerretani /  Adil Shamasdin, 6–3, 3–6, [11–9]

External links
Official Website
ITF Search
ATP official site

Bauer Watertechnology Cup
Challenger Eckental
Ecken